A. D. Eldridge was a member of the Wisconsin State Assembly.

Biography
Eldridge was born on April 29, 1851 in Menasha, Wisconsin. He would become involved in a number of businesses and work as a merchant.

Political career
Eldridge was elected to the Assembly in 1904. Additionally, he was a member and President of the Neenah, Wisconsin common council. He was a Republican.

References

People from Menasha, Wisconsin
Politicians from Neenah, Wisconsin
Republican Party members of the Wisconsin State Assembly
Wisconsin city council members
Businesspeople from Wisconsin
American merchants
1851 births
Year of death missing